Shirin Ab (also Romanized as Shīrīn Āb) is a village in Mahur Berenji Rural District, Sardasht District, Dezful County, Khuzestan Province, Iran. At the 2006 census, its population was 2017 in 398 families.

References 

Populated places in Dezful County